EUM may refer to:
 Eum (Korean name)
 Elisabeth University of Music, a Jesuit university in Japan
 Mexico

See also
EUMS (disambiguation)